The 2021–22 Denver Pioneers men's basketball team represented the University of Denver in the 2021–22 NCAA Division I men's basketball season. The Pioneers, led by first-year head coach Jeff Wulbrun, played their home games at Hamilton Gymnasium in Denver, Colorado, as members of the Summit League.

Previous season
In a season limited due to the ongoing COVID-19 pandemic, the Pioneers finished the 2020–21 season 2–19, 1–13 in Summit League play to finish in last place. They failed to qualify for the Summit League tournament.

On March 1, 2021, the school announced that there would be a "change in leadership," ending Rodney Billups' five-year tenure with the team. On March 29, it was announced that Stanford associate head coach Jeff Wulbrun would be the Pioneers' new head coach.

Roster

Schedule and results

|-
!colspan=12 style=| Non-conference regular season

|-
!colspan=9 style=| Summit League regular season

|-
!colspan=9 style=|Summit League tournament

Sources

References

Denver Pioneers men's basketball seasons
Denver Pioneers
Denver Pioneers men's basketball
Denver Pioneers men's basketball